Newtonia is a genus of passerine birds containing four to five species. They were formerly classified in the Old World warbler family Sylviidae or Old World flycatcher family Muscicapidae but have recently been shown to belong to the vanga family Vangidae.
They are endemic to Madagascar where they occur in forest or scrubland. They forage in pairs for insects, often joining mixed-species feeding flocks.

They are small plump birds, about 12 centimetres in length. They have slender bills and usually have a pale eye. Their plumage is mainly grey or brown, paler on the underparts. They have loud, repeated songs.

Species list
List of species in taxonomic order:
 Northern dark newtonia, Newtonia amphichroa
Southern dark newtonia, Newtonia lavarambo (sometimes considered a subspecies of N. amphichroa)
 Common newtonia, Newtonia brunneicauda	 	
 Archbold's newtonia, Newtonia archboldi	 	
 Red-tailed newtonia, Newtonia fanovanae

References

 Sinclair, Ian & Langrand, Olivier (2003) Birds of the Indian Ocean Islands, Struik, Cape Town.

 
Bird genera